Tian Dasht (also Romanized as Ţīān Dasht and Ţīāndasht; also known as Tīābash) is a village in Dastjerd Rural District, Alamut-e Gharbi District, Qazvin County, Qazvin Province, Iran. At the 2006 census, its population was 97, in 24 families.

References 

Populated places in Qazvin County